Events from the year 1891 in France.

Incumbents
President: Marie François Sadi Carnot 
President of the Council of Ministers: Charles de Freycinet

Events
 1 May – Nine killed and thirty wounded when troops fire on workers' May Day demonstration in support of eight-hour workday in Fourmies.
 27 August – France and Russia conclude defensive alliance.

Arts and literature
 Gustave Moreau becomes a professor at the École des Beaux-Arts in Paris.
 Henri Matisse begins his studies as an artist at École des Beaux-Arts

Births

January to June
 2 January – Didier Daurat, aviation pioneer (died 1969)
 14 January – Félix Goethals, cyclist (died 1962)
 19 April – Françoise Rosay, actress (died 1974)
 17 May – Roger Blaizot, General (died 1981)

July to September
 7 July – Xavier Vallat, politician and Commissioner-General for Jewish Questions in Vichy France (died 1972)
 11 July – Gabriel Benoist, writer (died 1964)
 21 July – Marcel-Frédéric Lubin-Lebrère, rugby union player (died 1972)
 6 August – Yvette Andréyor, actress (died 1962)
 9 August – Joseph-Marie Martin, Cardinal (died 1976)
 15 August – Jean De Briac, actor (died 1970)
 3 September – Marcel Grandjany, harpist and composer (died 1975)
 10 September – Raymond Abescat, oldest man in France and oldest veteran in France at the time of his death (died 2001)
 26 September – Charles Münch, conductor and violinist (died 1968)

October to December
 10 October – Raymond Bernard, filmmaker (died 1977)
 17 November – Jean Del Val, actor (died 1975)
 15 December – Martial Guéroult, philosopher and historian of philosophy (died 1976)
 26 December – Jean Galtier-Boissière, writer, polemist and journalist (died 1966)
 30 December – Antoine Pinay, politician and Prime Minister of France (died 1994)

Deaths

January to June
 14 January – Aimé Millet, sculptor (born 1819)
 16 January – Léo Delibes, composer (born 1836)
 21 January – Jean-Louis-Ernest Meissonier, painter and sculptor (born 1815)
 15 March – Théodore de Banville, poet and writer (born 1823)
 29 March – Armand-François-Marie de Charbonnel, Bishop of Toronto (born 1802)
 29 March – Georges-Pierre Seurat, painter (born 1859)
 24 May – Joseph Roumanille, poet (born 1818)

July to December
 7 July – Célestin Joseph Félix, Jesuit (born 1810)
 29 August – Pierre Lallement, bicycle inventor (b. c. 1843)
 5 September – Elie Delaunay, painter (born 1828)
 30 September – Georges Ernest Boulanger, general and politician (born 1837)
 3 October – Édouard Lucas, mathematician (born 1842)
 10 November – Arthur Rimbaud, poet (born 1854)
 26 November – Eugène Bouchut, physician (born 1818)
 12 December – Charles Émile Freppel, Bishop and politician (born 1827)
 December – Émile Bayard, illustrator (born 1837)

References

1890s in France